The Curry Stone Design Prize was an award given by the Curry Stone Foundation for innovative excellence in humanitarian design.  The Prize comes with no restrictions, and is given to design practitioners at many scales, and includes those active in architecture, urban planning, civic engagement, product design and heritage promotion.  The prize is awarded annually, with between one and five winners. The Prize’s stated mission is to “highlight, honor, and reward projects that improve daily living conditions for communities around the world.”

To be considered for the Prize, entrants are nominated by a network of leaders in humanitarian and social design.  The prizes are awarded by a rotating jury, which itself is selected annually.  To date, juries have included over 200 luminaries from the world of design and leaders within the public interest design movement.

Between 2008 and 2017, 26 winners were selected and received awards up to $100,000 USD.

Past Winners have included:

References

Awards established in 2008
Design awards